Boys & Girls is a five-track EP by Australian rock music group 67 Special, released in March 2005 (see 2005 in music). "Boys & Girls" reached No. 6 on the ARIA Hitseekers Singles Chart.

The group's bass guitarist, Bryan Dochstader, was interviewed by an Access All Areas.com.aus correspondent ahead of their debut album, The World Can Wait (August 2005). Dochstader explained why Boys & Girls was issued, "we had this album done before that and we did some b-sides in anticipation of releasing singles but we tend to shy away from singles so we kind of wanted to bundle these up and release it as a pre-album teaser so I guess that EP also served that purpose – each had their own little place to building up to this album."

Reception

Track listing

References 

67 Special albums
2005 EPs